General elections were held in Turkey in 1927. The Republican People's Party ("Association for the Defense of the Rights of Anatolia and Rumelia" until 9 September 1923) was the only party in the country at the time, as the Progressive Republican Party that had been set up in 1924 was dissolved the following year.

Electoral system
The elections were held under the Ottoman electoral law passed in 1908, which provided for a two-stage process. In the first stage, voters elected secondary electors (one for the first 750 voters in a constituency, then one for every additional 500 voters). In the second stage the secondary electors elected the members of the Turkish Grand National Assembly.

References

1927
1927 elections in Turkey
One-party elections